Fullerton India Credit Co. Ltd. is a non - banking financial company in India. It is headquartered at Mumbai, India and deals with financing across retail and rural segments. The company provides unsecured as well as secured lending products through a diverse branch network as well as via digital channels to individuals and MSMEs.

Overview 
Fullerton India Credit Co. Ltd. largely deals with unsecured lending products such as personal loans, unsecured business loans, group loans and so on across retail and rural segments. Over the years, the company has established 628 branches spread across India, serving over 2.3 million customers.

History

Fullerton India Credit Company Ltd. was established in July 2007. Sumitomo Mitsui Financial Group or SMFG, Japan owns a major stake (up to 74.9%)  with Fullerton Financial Holdings, Singapore (25.1% stake) possessing most of the remainder. SMFG is one of the largest global banking and financial groups, offering a wide range of financial services including commercial banking, leasing, securities and consumer finance with a heritage of over 400 years in Japan. Fullerton India Fullerton Financial Holdings, is in turn, 100% held by Temasek, Singapore - an investment company owned by Government of Singapore with an autonomous independent board. In 2016, the company launched its housing finance company Fullerton India Home Finance Company Limited (FIHFC), also known as Grihashakti.

Management
Shantanu Mitra- Chief Executive Officer & Managing Director 
 Ajay Pareek - Chief Business Officer 
Pankaj Malik  - Chief Financial Officer & Head of Strategy Execution
Dhananjay Tiwari - Chief Risk Officer 
Swaminathan Subramanian - Chief People Officer 
 Deepak Patkar – Chief Executive Officer of Grihashakti, Fullerton India Home Finance Company Limited

Businesses
Fullerton India Credit Company Ltd. deals with financing across segments over a variety of distribution channels.

Urban financing
Offers secured as well as unsecured lending across Metro, Tier 1 – 4 cities through its branch network. The unsecured business covers products such as personal loans, two wheeler loans and small business loans, while the secured business covers products such as loan against property to individual as well as SME customers, loan against securities, commercial vehicle loans and so on.

Rural financing
Fullerton India covers more than 600 towns and 58,000 villages in rural India. It offers rural customers lines of credit for personal as well as livelihood purposes such as purchase of merchandise, livestock, etc.

Digital Business 
Fullerton India recently launched its digital business in 2018. This channel focuses on digital technologies such as an online web portal, mobile applications and tablets. It also focuses on strategic partnerships with fintech companies and aggregators such as Paytm to derive symbiotic benefits and services.

Fullerton India Home Finance Company Limited (FIHFC)
Fullerton India Home Finance Ltd or "Grihashakti" is a wholly owned subsidiary of Fullerton India Credit Co. Ltd. This company focuses on providing financing to householders across India, including sale of new / old residential property, commercial property purchase or leasing, balance transfers and so on. Launched in December 2015 and head-quartered in Mumbai, the company with its 70 branches offers loans to salaried and self-employed individuals and organisations.

References

2007 establishments in Maharashtra
Indian companies established in 2007
Financial services companies based in Mumbai
Financial services companies established in 2007